Azul (Blue) is the fourth album by Argentine rock band Los Piojos, recorded at Del Cielito Records studio and released in 1998. This work mixes candombe and murga with the traditional rhythms used by the band and was presented live in Parque Sarmiento and at the All Boys stadium.

Reception
The AllMusic review by Victor W. Valdivia awarded the album 4 stars stating "Los Piojos are amazingly eclectic in their approach to music... they incorporate reggae and Caribbean rhythms, but they also show an influence of classic rock and alternative. That's not to say that they don't explore their Latin roots on various instances... The lyrics are also wide-ranging, veering from nakedly revealing self-portraits to Michael Stipe-like inscrutability. As diverse as the album gets, though, nothing ever feels forced or contrived. Azul is the only one of Los Piojos' four albums available in the U.S, but it is a superb introduction to their talent and may inspire listeners to seek out their earlier releases."

Track listing 
All tracks by Andrés Ciro Martínez except where noted.

"Vals inicial" [Initial Waltz] (Gustavo H. Kupinski, Martinez) – 5:58
"El balneario de los doctores crotos" [The useless doctors spa] – 4:02
"Genius" [Genius] – 4:12
"A ver cuando" [Let's see when] (Martinez, Miguel Angel Rodriguez) – 4:58
"Desde lejos no se ve" [It can't be seen from far] (Dani Buira, Kupinski, Martinez) – 4:39
"Sucio can" [Dirty dog] – 3:29
"El Rey del Blues (B. B. King)" [Blues King (B.B. King)] – 4:02
"Y que más" [And what else] – 4:50
"Agua" [Water] – 4:58
"Buenos tiempos" [Good times] (Buira, Kupinski, Martinez) – 3:58
"Go negro go" [Go black go] – 5:05
"Uoh pa pa pa" [Uoh pa pa pa] (Martinez, Piti) – 3:03
"Quemado" [Burned] – 5:39
"Murguita" [Little murga] – 3:30
"Olvídate (Ya ves)" [Forget it (you see)] – 4:15
"Finale" [Final] – 1:25

Personnel 
Abraham Becker – violin
Miguel Angel Bertero – violin
Adrián Bilbao – engineer, mixing, recording technician, sampling
Dani Buira – drums, percussion
Javier Casalla – violin
Juan Cruz De Urquiza – trumpet
Alejandro Elijovich – violin
Ciro Fogliatta – organ
Chris Gehringer – mastering
Andrés Ciro Martínez – cornet, backing vocals, guitar, harmonic, vocals
Andrés Mayo – editing
Carlos Nozzi – cello
Martin Pomares – production assistant
Juan "Pollo" Raffo – arranger, backing vocals, strings, director, organ
Humberto Ridolfi – violin
Pablo Rodríguez – sax, sax
Mario Tenreyro – corno D
Alfredo Toth – producer
Patricio Villarejo – cello
Washington Williman – violin

References

External links 
Azul 

1998 albums
Los Piojos albums